George Martin (3 May 1869 – 24 February 1961) was a New Zealand cricketer who played for Otago. He was born in Napier and died in Dunedin.

Martin made a single first-class appearance for the team, during the 1908–09 season, against Hawke's Bay. From the tailend, he scored 5 runs in the only innings in which he batted.

See also
 List of Otago representative cricketers

External links
George Martin at Cricket Archive 

1869 births
1961 deaths
New Zealand cricketers
Otago cricketers